Tissot Arena is a combined multi-purpose stadium and arena in Biel/Bienne, Canton of Bern, Switzerland. It consists of a football stadium, an ice hockey arena, an outdoor ice skating rink and a curling hall. It is currently used by Swiss Challenge League football club FC Biel-Bienne and National League A ice hockey club EHC Biel.

Overview
The stadium and arena of the Tissot Arena serve as replacements of the Gurzelen football stadium and the Biel ice hockey arena. The football stadium part of the Tissot Arena is in the south-west side of the building complex and the ice rinks in the north-east. The watch manufacturer Tissot, a member of The Swatch Group that has a head office in Biel/Bienne, obtained naming rights of the arena for at least ten years.

The football stadium has a capacity of 5,200 and it is extendable to 10,000 if needed. The ice hockey arena accommodates 6,521 spectators. Part of the electricity for the arena complex is produced by the 8,100 solar panels installed on the roofs of the Arena.

International matches

Football

Men's national teams

Women's national teams

Ice hockey

See also
 List of indoor arenas in Switzerland

References

External links

 

Football venues in the Canton of Bern
Biel/Bienne
Multi-purpose stadiums in Switzerland
Sports venues in the Canton of Bern
Sports venues in Switzerland
FC Biel-Bienne
Indoor arenas in Switzerland
Indoor ice hockey venues in Switzerland